Jim Mooney (1919–2008) was an American comic book artist.

Jim or James Mooney may also refer to:
Jim Mooney (baseball) (1906–1979), pitcher for the St. Louis Cardinals and New York Giants
Jim Mooney (basketball) (1930–2015), American basketball player for the Philadelphia Warriors
Jim Mooney (American football) (1907–1944), American football player
Jim Mooney (Australian politician) (1923–2007), Australian politician

James Mooney (1861–1921), American anthropologist
James D. Mooney (1884–1957), American business executive
James Mooney (Queensland politician) (c. 1829–1873), alderman in the Brisbane Municipal Council
Jim Mooney (Florida politician) Florida politician